Norbert Larose (8 June 1899 – 24 April 1954) was a French racing cyclist. He rode in the 1926 Tour de France.

References

1899 births
1954 deaths
French male cyclists
Place of birth missing